Minor league football, also known as alternative football or secondary football, is an umbrella term for pro football (gridiron) that is played below the major league level.

The National Football League and Canadian Football League are both designated as major leagues, but contrary to the four other major sports leagues in North America—Major League Baseball, Major League Soccer, the National Basketball Association, and the National Hockey League—no formal development farm system was in use after the NFL severed ties with all minor league teams in 1948. The developmental league concept was shuttered again with the cancellation of NFL Europe in 2006.

Since 2018, the CFL has had a partnership agreement with the Professional American Football League of Mexico (LFA) for player development, but does not consider it a minor league in the traditional sense. In 2023, the NFL signed a collaboration agreement with the XFL on rules, equipment, and safety testing, but the agreement does not cover sharing players for developmental purposes.

There have been professional football leagues of varying levels since the invention of the sport, and over the years there have been attempts to organize development or farm leagues such as the Association of Professional Football Leagues and the World League of American Football, later know as NFL Europe and then NFL Europa, but they failed to produce profits and were eventually shut down. As a result, over time the North American leagues settled into an informal hierarchy, with many aspiring entrepreneurs trying to establish rival, alternative, or supplemental leagues to the NFL, similar to baseball's independent leagues. To this day, beside the All-America Football Conference and the American Football League, the latter of which merged with the NFL, none of the other leagues have succeeded, particularly because the leagues' inability to generate television revenue to keep them afloat in their first years of existence.

In modern times, the NFL has developed players not ready for the active roster through each team's practice squad, or relied on college football and separate entities like the now-defunct Arena Football League as their feeder organizations. Since the beginning of the 21st century, three fledgling pro football leagues—the United Football League, the Fall Experimental Football League and the Alliance of American Football (AAF)—had hoped to create a relationship with the NFL as developmental minor leagues, but all folded without any such connection being made. Nevertheless, some players did find a path to the NFL through those leagues, especially the high-level ones like the AAF, XFL, and United States Football League (USFL). 

Currently, there are five active minor leagues in North America: the USFL, XFL, the Gridiron Developmental Football League, the Rivals Professional Football League, and the Liga de Fútbol Americano Profesional, with the latter the only Mexican league. The USFL and XFL are considered high-level leagues, and the rest are viewed as low-level leagues.

History

Early circuits (1890–1919)
The birth of semi-professional football can be traced back to the 1880s, when most sports clubs in America had a team playing football, and ostensibly played without paid players. In reality, most teams often found ways around that, and acquired the best players with the promise of jobs and trophies or watches to play against top regional clubs and colleges. While the practice of professional and semi-pro teams playing college and amateur teams was common in the 1880s and 1890s, most notably with the establishment of a coalition of teams that operated from 1886 to 1895 in the New York metropolitan area called the American Football Union, in the 20th century college and professional football began to diverge, and college-professional interplay effectively ended after the NCAA formed in 1906. During this time, the most prominent circuit was the Western Pennsylvania Professional Football Circuit.

The first attempt to form a pro league was the National Football League of 1902, which, despite its name, was a Pennsylvania regional league, with two teams based in Philadelphia and the third from Pittsburgh. The next step came when promoter Tom O'Rourke established the World Series of Football, also in 1902. The series played indoors at New York City's Madison Square Garden and consisted of five teams: three from the state of New York, one from New Jersey, and another team called New York comprising two Philadelphia teams, the Athletics and Phillies. The 1903 series also featured the Franklin Athletic Club from Pennsylvania.

At the same time, the Massillon Tigers, the Columbus Panhandles, and the Canton Bulldogs, all from Ohio, started attracting much of the top professional football talent in America: Harry McChesney, Bob Shiring, the Nesser brothers, Blondy Wallace, Cub Buck, and later Jim Thorpe, and gave rise to the Ohio League. The league was actually a circuit— an informal and loose association of independent teams playing other local teams and competing for the Ohio Independent Championship. The group pioneered the concept of avoiding competition with college football games by playing games on Sundays, which was illegal in other states due to the existing blue laws. This eventually became the professional standard.

The Ohio League decade-long monopoly began to lose hold in the 1910s, with the formation of the New York Pro Football League (NYPFL), first league to use a playoff format, and other associations in the Midwest, particularly in Illinois. The rise in level of play resulted in barnstorming tours between the circuits, which laid the foundations for the first truly national major league: the American Professional Football Association in 1920, which later became the NFL.

The Golden Era
The first minor leagues period of prosperity or "heyday" started in the 1920s and lasted until the end of World War II. By the 1930s, football was not a fledgling enterprise, but pro football was, as even the National Football League had trouble attracting fans, and was located mostly in the northeastern quarter of the United States. In other parts of the country, several regional leagues tried their luck in the pro game, along with flourishing regional circuits of independent teams, recapturing the pro football roots. The era is also considered the best of all time, due to the quality of play, as there were only 250 players in the NFL, while the regional leagues could sometimes offer better pay and jobs, and offered black players opportunity to play during the period of 1933–1946, when they were excluded from all NFL teams.

In 1934, the American Football League (AFL) was the first true attempt to establish pro football in the American South and Southwest regions. The league was formed by the strongest independent teams in the region, including the Memphis Tigers, who claimed the national pro championship in 1929, after beating the NFL champion Green Bay Packers. The AFL had only one season of competition and folded after only the Memphis Tigers and Charlotte Bantams completed their seasons.

Another strong southern league was the Dixie League, which represented Mid Atlantic teams. The league was one of the most successful minor leagues in history, playing eight seasons in eleven years, while claiming to be the highest level minor football league of the era. Unlike most pro-football minor leagues, the Dixie League had a relative stable membership until the Pearl Harbor attack forced the league into hiatus. The league returned in 1946, but folded in 1947 after playing only one week.

The Dixie League's biggest counterpart was the American Association (AA) football league. The AA was formed by the nucleus of independent teams that played in the New York and New Jersey circuits, and was led by president Joe Rosentover. The league teams sought relationships with the NFL, and several teams, including the Newark Bears, Brooklyn Eagles, and Jersey City Giants, functioned as a farm system for the major NFL teams. The league allowed black players to participate, including the last African-American in the NFL in 1933, Joe Lillard. Most teams scheduled games against the independent Fritz Pollard's Harlem Brown Bombers. The league closed operations during World War II, and after a four-year hiatus, the AA was renamed the American Football League and expanded to include teams in Ohio and Pennsylvania. The league's demise was caused by the NFL severing ties with all minor league teams in 1948.

The last of the "Big Three Leagues" was the Pacific Coast Professional Football League, which started in 1940. The roots of pro football in the west are attributable to the Red Grange barnstorming tour with the Chicago Bears in 1926, as some short-lived leagues, including the 1926 Pacific Coast Professional Football League (PCPFL) and 1934–1935 American Legion League, were formed. The PCPFL was formed thanks to the financial backbone of the sport in California, the Los Angeles Bulldogs, billed as the "best football team in existence outside the NFL", and the only prominent minor football league to operate during the war years. The league became home to the top African American football talents in the country, including Kenny Washington, Woody Strode, Ozzie Simmons, Mel Reid, and briefly Jackie Robinson during the NFL enforced color barrier. The league played its last season in 1948, two years after the NFL moved the Los Angeles Rams to Los Angeles. The Big Three reached an agreement with the NFL, and in 1946 formed the Association of Professional Football Leagues as a formal farm system with the league. The agreement lasted less than two years, after the NFL cancelled it altogether in 1948. The termination triggered the end of the era.

Other prominent leagues were the Anthracite League of Pennsylvania, the Eastern League of Professional Football based in Pennsylvania and New Jersey, the Ohio Valley League, the Midwest Football League, and the Northwest War Industries League in Washington and Oregon. During the 1930s and 1940s, there were also strong independent circuits in Greater New York metropolitan area and the Northeast.

The second wave
The minor leagues experienced a renaissance in the 1960s and 1970s; their growing relevance occurred alongside the AFL and NFL rivalry. Several prominent leagues operated during that period and were mostly regional. The original United Football League (UFL) lasted from 1961 to 1964 and was concentrated in the Midwest, and was the first football league to operate teams in both the United States and Canada, as the Quebec Rifles played in the league in 1964. The Northeast Atlantic Coast Football League (ACFL) formed in 1962 and was run by Joe Rosentover, former president of the 1930s AA.

In April 1964, the two leagues, along with the Central States Football League, the Midwest Football League, and the Southern Football League, formed the Association of Minor Football Leagues. The association also included the non-paying semi-pro New England Football Conference, and appointed UFL commissioner George T. Gareff as the CEO. The association represented teams in fifty cities spanning twenty-one U.S. states plus Quebec, and scheduled exhibition games between leagues, but disbanded after two years without notice.

When the UFL folded and the Newark Bears of the ACFL unsuccessfully applied to join the AFL, two new national leagues formed. The first was the North American Football League (NAFL), which ran from 1965 to 1966, and tried to establish major league affiliations with either the NFL or the AFL. The second, the Continental Football League (CoFL), which ran from 1965 to 1971, was probably the biggest in the era, and attracted three teams from the ACFL: the Hartford Charter Oaks, the Newark Bears, and the Norfolk Neptunes.

Some of the other notable leagues were the Professional Football League of America (PFLA), which lasted from 1965 to 1967 and played in the Midwest, essentially replacing the UFL, the North Pacific Football League (NPFL), and the Texas Football League (TFL), which operated in the southern United States. Those leagues would later merge with the CoFL, as several teams from the NPFL joined the league in 1966, and the PFLA followed in 1968, resulting in the dissolution of both leagues. In 1969, the CoFL announced the all eight teams from TFL were being added to its ranks as a separate division, and were scheduled to play mostly against each other, along with a few inter-league contests.

The two bigger leagues, the CoFL and ACFL, had different strategies: the CoFL aimed to remain independent, while the ACFL functioned as a developmental league and, like previous Rosentover leagues, allowed its teams to become farm teams for the AFL and NFL. Over their existence, the CoFL arguably had better talent move on to NFL and Canadian Football League (CFL) stardom, including Ken Stabler, Don Jonas, and Sam Wyche, but folded in 1969, and again in 1971 as an incarnation called the Trans-American Football League formed with remnants of the TFL; plans to take on the Canadian Football League head-to-head were abandoned. Although the revival as the TAFL was largely a failure, the league foreshadowed the future of minor football, as it played its season in the spring to avoid direct competition against football in the fall.

The ACFL also produced some significant talent, such as Pro Bowler Marvin Hubbard, first female professional football player Patricia Palinkas, who was placeholder for her husband Stephen, and cult figure King Corcoran. It also lasted longer. The league operated continuously through 1971, with a return season in 1973, which was played mostly by promoted teams from the lower-level Seaboard Football League (SFL), which in turn, brought up semi-pro teams to replace them. However, the attempted major World Football League (WFL) sapped both leagues of most of their talent, forcing them to fold by 1974. The league's first collapse in 1972, along with the demise of the Midwest Professional Football League, ended the era of NFL teams having individual farm teams.

During its existence, the SFL hovered between a minor league and semi-pro, as some of its players, most notably Joe Klecko,)  were never paid, and others received only fifty dollars per game. Despite that, the league had some notable alumni, including Vince Papale, Jack Dolbin, and Klecko. Additionally, the league was the last minor league to play an inter-league exhibition match against an NFL team, when the New York Jets rookies defeated Long Island Chiefs 29–3.

One other minor league attempt in the 1970s was the American Football Association (AFA), which operated from 1977 to 1983, was less successful, as it struggled to acquire recognizable players and failed to secure a TV deal. The AFA followed the model set by the TAFL, and played its from May to August. The formation of the first United States Football League (USFL) in 1982 led to a decline in AFA talent, a move to semi-pro status, and a cancellation of the league entirely after the 1983 season.

Near the end of the era, there was one last attempt to organize non-NFL pro teams under one umbrella, with the establishment of the Minor Professional Football Association, which represented more than 200 teams and about 10,000 players. From 1980 through 1985, the association sponsored an annual post-season championship tournament for minor league teams, with an attempt to establish a minor-league system. In 1981 the association reached an agreement with the NFL to hold a special national all-star game for minor leaguers, the day before the Super Bowl, with scouts in attendance. The NFL had the right to sign any player from the association for a $1,500 payment to the team that held his contract. But the agreement did not continue, and in 1986 the association reformed into the American Football Association (AFA) and focused on providing services to semi-pro and amateur teams around the US. The development of arena football and the birth of the Arena Football League (AFL) in 1987 effectively ended the era, reducing most outdoor leagues to amateur or semi-pro status.

NFL Europe

After the turmoil in the 1980s, the NFL decided to form its own league in 1991, the World League of American Football, as a spring developmental league. For the first time, an American sport league had a European division as part of its ten-team league, while the other teams were located in continental US and Canada. The league was used to test rule changes and technical innovations and planned as a farm system for NFL teams. However, the first two seasons produced low TV ratings, and the league was put on hiatus until 1995. When it came back, the league was based entirely in Europe, reduced to six teams, and re-branded in 1998 as NFL Europe. The league kept the same format until 2007, when the NFL terminated it. Ultimately, the league was one of the longest tenured high-level minor leagues in history, lasting fifteen years in total and producing players like Hall of Famer Kurt Warner and Super Bowl quarterbacks Brad Johnson and Jake Delhomme. Other notable players include Dante Hall, David Akers, James Harrison, Adam Vinatieri, and William Perry.

Modern era

Early 2000s
In the late 1990s and early 2000s, a wave of entrepreneurs tried forming new leagues in the ever growing football market.

The first league was the self-styled "major league of spring football" Regional Football League (RFL) that played a single season in 1999. The league was initially planned to begin in 1998, but financial difficulties delayed it by a year and changed the business plan, transforming it into a lower-budget league featuring just six teams from mid-sized cities mostly located the southern United States. The league did not prosper, as it failed to secure a television contract and was forced to play a shortened eight-week season. Although the league was unsuccessful, it pioneered the idea of assigning players teams based of the region where they played in college.

Parallel to the RFL, there were two more attempts to start up new leagues. The first, the International Football Federation, folded so rapidly it is considered the shortest football league in history, ceasing operations before completing the preliminary planning stages. The second, the Spring Football League, was founded by several ex-NFL players: Bo Jackson, Drew Pearson, Eric Dickerson, and Tony Dorsett. It failed to attract big investors on account of the tech-market crash of 2000, and was cancelled after only two weeks.

The next attempt was probably the most significant since the emergence of the AFL in 1960, as NBC and the WWE collaborate to form the (original) XFL in 2001. Although 14 million viewers tuned in for the first game, the Nielsen ratings later plummeted and triggered NBC to pulled out of its broadcast contract, and the league folded after one season. The league featured several changes in rules and broadcast style, and gave birth to the Skycam in sports broadcasting.

From the late 2000s into the early 2010s, many startup leagues had trouble attracting investors. Five high-profile attempts by the All American Football and United National Gridiron leagues in 2007, the New United States Football League in 2010 and 2014, and the A-11 Football League in 2014, never materialized. Two other leagues in the era were the low-level New World Football League (NWFL) and the Stars Football League (SFL), both of which survived three seasons: the NWFL from 2008 to 2010, and the SFL from 2011 to 2013.

The modern-day United Football League (UFL) was the most prominent league in the era, playing 3½ seasons before folding. The UFL was fairly successful, attracting big crowds in Omaha, Sacramento, and Hartford and airing all league games on Versus, HDnet, and over the Internet, and had plans to expand. It functioned as a single-entity league following the Major League Soccer model. The UFL featured former NFL players, and was the first professional fall league other than the National Football League to play in the United States since the mid-1970s. The league collapsed in the middle of its 2012 season, failing to pay the bills after most investors stepped out.

The Fall Experimental Football League (FXFL), founded in 2014, was the first league that openly embraced the minor league concept, and aimed to become a professional feeder system for the NFL. The league owner, Brian Woods, wanted his franchises to be primarily based in minor league baseball stadiums, and use the infrastructure in place to attract fans. The FXFL attracted the final NFL roster cuts, for the purpose of keeping them "in football shape, physically and mentally". The league was cancelled after two abbreviated seasons, and was reformatted as the developmental Spring League in 2016.

New resurgence
In 2018, several figures with connections to the original 2001 XFL entered the spring-football market with rival leagues. The first was the Alliance of American Football (AAF), founded by Charlie Ebersol and Bill Polian, which began playing in 2019, but ceased operations eight weeks in, as the controlling owner Thomas Dundon decided to pull the plug after the league made a deal with the NFL, which planned to take ownership of 15% of the league.

The second was the relaunched version of the XFL, as Vince McMahon hired Oliver Luck as commissioner. The league first began play in 2020, with more success and a better reception than its first iteration, and aired on ABC, ESPN, and Fox Sports. After five weeks of play, the XFL announced its season would end because of growing COVID-19 pandemic concerns. The league was on hiatus in 2021 and 2022, after it filed for bankruptcy and put up for sale by McMahon and was later sold to Dany Garcia, Dwayne "The Rock" Johnson and RedBird Capital, and began its second season on February 18, 2023.

Six other leagues have entered the planning stage, but have yet to launch. The first is the Spring League of American Football, a planned high-level minor league that was first announced in September 2016, by two former Madison Square Garden executives, but did not acquire any funding to begin play. As of 2023, the league appears defunct, with no official website and no news since 2018. Major League Football was founded in 2014, but so far only has two cancelled seasons in 2016 and 2022. The American Patriot League was founded in 2018 and planned to start in 2019, held two league showcase and allocated players and coaches to teams, but still hasn't launched because of the COVID-19 pandemic. The league is currently planning a 2023 inaugural season. Another planned league is the Freedom Football League, also founded in 2018, run by former NFL players Jeff Garcia, Ricky Williams, Terrell Owens, and Simeon Rice, with an initial 2020 starting season, but with no recent updates to its timeline.

The last two were developmental-level leagues. The first was Pacific Pro Football, founded in 2017 and designed for non-NFL eligible players; it was abandoned in mid-2020 after several investors backed out, and was reformatted to a scouting event called HUB Football. The other, Your Call Football, did start, lasted from 2018 to 2019, and featured concepts that gave the fans the power to control the outcome, which were also adopted by the indoor Fan Controlled Football league, but was abandoned when its parent company moved on to adapting the technology in other sporting environments.

Since 2017, a developmental league called The Spring League (TSL) was aimed at professional athletes but acted as "instructional league and showcase for professional football talent" with abbreviated seasons. On June 3, 2021, TSL owner Brian Woods announced that he had acquired the remaining extant trademarks of the United States Football League and launched a USFL-branded league in 2022, with Fox Sports owning the league and reportedly committing $150 million over three years to its operations, essentially ending the five years run of TSL, and establishing the USFL as a new high-level minor league.

System and structure
There have been professional football leagues of varying levels since the invention of the sport, with the NFL dominant through most of the 20th century and into the 21st. There have been many attempts to start rival major leagues, most recently the original United States Football League (USFL), but most leagues that followed have been high-level minor leagues such as the XFL, the UFL and the AAF. Whether major or minor, most football leagues have tried to establish teams in large, untapped U.S. markets.

Most of the minor leagues have been separated through the years into three de facto categories: high-level, including the Pacific Coast Professional Football League (PCPFL), the original XFL, and the Alliance of American Football (AAF); low-level, such as the American Football Association (AFA) and Seaboard Football League (SFL); and semi-professional leagues. Today, there are also mid-level leagues, including the Regional Football League (RFL) and Fall Experimental Football League (FXFL) and developmental leagues, such as The Spring League (TSL) and Your Call Football.

The categories are usually determined by the following rules: the high-level leagues salaries are above the median personal income in the United States, mid-level leagues pay at approximately median level, and the low-level leagues pay around or below the minimum wage in the United States. The developmental leagues do not pay salaries or contract with non-NFL eligible players, and are designed to showcase the players' skills for future opportunities.

Since 1998, there have been more than twenty traditional or indoorfootball leagues that played an average of 3½ years before folding or merging with others; some never reached the stage of playing games. There are five active minor leagues in North America: two high-level, the second USFL and second XFL; and three low-level leagues, the Gridiron Developmental Football League, the Rivals Professional Football League, and the Mexican Liga de Fútbol Americano Profesional.

Indoor American football
The high cost of supporting an entire roster of professional players and stadium fees led to an indoor variation with the launch of the Arena Football League (AFL) in 1987. In its heyday, the it functioned as de facto minor league to the NFL, as six NFL team owners—Atlanta Falcons, Dallas Cowboys, Denver Broncos, Detroit Lions, New Orleans Saints and Tennessee Titans—had purchased teams in the AFL, and many players and coaches made the transition between leagues. On February 8, 1999, the NFL also purchased, but never exercised, an option to buy a major interest in the AFL. As of 2023, the Indoor Football League (IFL) has a player personnel partnership with the XFL, to function as their de facto minor league.

Prior to the first AFL's collapse in 2008, the league had its own minor developmental league called af2, which never actually .functioned as a farm system but it dissolved after the 2009 season amid financial problems rooted in the 2007–2008 financial crisis, and several of its teams joined the second AFL, which began play in 2010.

Today, the indoor variation of football also has an unofficial minor-league hierarchy, although no major indoor league exists currently after the second AFL went bankrupt in 2019. Pro leagues pay varying salaries on a per-game basis, while the high-level leagues also provide housing, health insurance, and two meals per day to players during the season.

The categories are more fluid than the outdoor variation, but usually determined by per-game salaries and arena size:
 High-level – Fan Controlled Football*, Indoor Football League, National Arena League
 Mid-level – Champions Indoor Football
 Low-level – American Indoor Football Alliance, American Arena League, American West Football Conference

* The  is a 7-on-7 indoor league.

Semi-pro football
Semi-pro leagues have existed since the beginning of American football, but were far more common in the early and mid 20th century than they are today. Football is especially suited for semi-pro play, and most leagues often operate at a semi-professional level due to cost concerns. Furthermore, because they play only one game per week, the players are able to pursue outside employment. In the 21st century, the semi-pro circuits usually attract only local players and teams don't pay salaries, although in the past most teams helped players find local jobs within the community. Over the years, semi-pro leagues were effectively a farm system for the NFL, attracting college players on the cusp of playing in the NFL who needed to stay in shape.

The semi-pro game experienced two peak periods: first in the 1950s, then in the 1970s and 1980s, when minor leagues started disappearing. Instead, the level below the NFL tended to take the form of local, sometimes unofficial leagues matching teams from different neighborhoods or suburbs of big cities with little to no pay. The semi-pro leagues role in history is best portrayed in the 1987 24-day NFLPA Strike, when semi-pro players were called up as replacements after the third week of the NFL season was cancelled. Their stories are documented in the 2017 ESPN film Year of the Scab. The decline of semi-pro football is attributable to the rise of college football in the 1980s, and the subsequent growth of a vast pool of young talent from which the NFL can draw.

Notable semi-pro players include Johnny Unitas, who played quarterback, safety, and punter on a Pittsburgh suburb team called the Bloomfield Rams for six dollars per game before joining the Baltimore Colts; Eric Swann, who played for the Bay State Titans in the Boston suburb of Lynn and was the first, and so far the only, player to be drafted into the NFL draft first round from a semi-pro organization; and Ray Seals, who did not play college football, but made his way to the NFL through the semi-pro rank Syracuse Express.

The Watertown Red & Black, a semi-professional team that currently plays in the Empire Football League, is the oldest existing football club, tracing its history to 1896.

Minor League Football System
After the decline of the minor leagues in the 1980s, the semi-pro circuit tried to fill that niche. In the summer of 1989, the Minor League Football System (MLFS) was formed as an attempt to develop a nationwide semi-pro football league. The circuit had aspirations to become a feeder system for the NFL and featured eleven teams in as many states. The league's commissioner was Roger Wehrli. Because the league wanted to attract good local talent but did not pay, it functioned as a temporary employment agency, and offered jobs and housing for players in local communities during the season. Despite that, it managed to attract decent talent, including ex-NFL players such as Rusty Hilger and Ben Rudolph, as well as coaches including Walt Michaels, Darryl Rogers and Lou Saban. After a successful first season, the league attracted strong sponsors in Wilson and Gatorade, but two teams folded midway through the second year, while the rest folded after the end of the season, unable to establish a working agreement with the NFL.

Modern circuit
Today, most leagues and independent teams are sanctioned by the American Football Association, which acts as an organizer of games and playoff tournaments for teams throughout the U.S. and maintains a Minor League/Semi-Pro Football Hall of Fame. Another semi-pro organization is the USA Bowl Championship Series, which ranks the top twenty-five semi-pro and amateur teams in the country, and crowns an annual "national champion" at the USA Bowl. The final such association is the United States Federation of American Football, which tries to divide the existing leagues into AAA and AA groups rated by business practices, representation, and athletics; it was formerly recognized by the International Federation of American Football as the USA's football governing body.

Under USA Football and Football Canada criteria, players at this level are eligible for the United States national American football team and Canada men's national football team, respectively.

The prominent present-day leagues in the adult amateur/semi-pro US circuit are:

* The  is unique in the American sports landscape, allowing promotion and relegation among conferences.

In Canada there are three prominent leagues:

The AFL and NFC are considered bigger leagues, and every September the NFC champion meets the champion of the AFL to determine the Canadian Major Football League national champions. Canada also has three prominent junior leagues: the Atlantic Football League, the Canadian Junior Football League, and the Quebec Junior Football League.

International American Football Leagues
American football continues to grow in popularity worldwide, and has had International Olympic Committee recognition since 2013. The NFL has tried to expand their exposure to additional markets by playing games outside the United States. The first pro game outside the U.S. and Canada was played in Japan in 1976. In 1978 the NFL played in Mexico, and in 1983 they had their first game in Europe, in London.

With the success of the international series in the 1970s and 1980s, other countries established their own leagues that have earned good reputations over the years, especially the long-established leagues throughout Europe and in Japan. European leagues and teams attract and sign American coaches and import players, some of whom have NFL experience, from U.S. colleges or other leagues. The number of import players allowed per team is set by league rules. The typical American import player contract includes a monthly salary, housing, insurance, transportation, round trip flights, meals, and possible performance bonuses. The top leagues in Europe are traditionally the German Football League (GFL), Austrian Football League, Italian Football League, and the Finnish league. The X-League in Japan, which plays under NCAA or NFL rules, is also very strong.

Usually the foreign players in the National Football League moved to the US early, and played the game in college, but there are exceptions. Anthony Dablé, a French football player, was the first foreign pro player to sign in the NFL. Moritz Böhringer was drafted in 2016 directly from the GFL, but did not play in an official game before returning to the GFL in 2021. Efe Obada was the first player to make an NFL 53-man active roster. Since 2017, the NFL has run the International Player Pathway Program (IPPP) to increase the number of non-American and non-Canadian players in the league.

Since 2017, the Canadian Football League (CFL) has tried to globalize as well, and made partnership agreements with football leagues in Austria, Denmark, Finland, France, Germany, Italy, Japan, Mexico, Norway, Sweden, and the United Kingdom. The league held a special draft in 2019 for Mexican born players, and another one for European players., and held a special global scouting combine in Europe, Mexico, and Japan in 2020. Today, each CFL team includes two designated global-player roster spots for players from outside the U.S. and Canada.

Another international league that has entered into partnership agreements with American league for players developments is the Elite Football League of India, which has an agreement with the Gridiron Developmental Football League.

European League of Football

In March 2021, a new league, the European League of Football, announced it had reached an agreement with the NFL to be able to use team names from the days of NFL Europe. The league is a professional American football league, and consists of seventeen teams located in nine countries: Germany, Poland, Spain, Austria, Italy, Switzerland,  Hungary, Czech Republic and France. There are plans to expand to twenty-four teams by 2025. KaVontae Turpin was the first ELF alum who played in the NFL, while Adedayo Odeleye and Marcel Dabo signed as practice squad players through the league's IPPP.

Australian Football League

American football uses significantly different rules than Australian rules football played in the Australian Football League (AFL). However, the punting specialist position requires similar skills under both rule sets. The most successful player to ever make the transition from the AFL to the NFL is Darren Bennett, who was selected to the NFL 1990s All-Decade Team. Because salaries are usually up to five times higher in the U.S., a high number of players try their luck in the American game. In the last decade, the NFL has placed full-time development officers in Australia, and there is a full-time punting academy in the Australian continent called Prokick Australia. – which is aimed at training and assessing talented punters from the country for positions in major U.S. colleges and the NFL.

Although the vast majority of Australian players in the NFL are punters, there are a few exceptions. The most famous is offensive tackle Jordan Mailata, who played Rugby league and was drafted in 2018 without college experience. Another example is Joel Wilkinson, who signed with the Arizona Cardinals as a cornerback. Defensive end Adam Gotsis is probably the most successful non-punter Australian. He played at Georgia Tech in college and was drafted in the second round of the 2016 NFL Draft by the Denver Broncos. Other notable players are Jarryd Hayne and Jesse Williams.

Current and planned Minor leagues

Current leagues

High-level
  XFL, 2020; 2023–
  United States Football League (USFL), 2022–

Low-level
  Gridiron Developmental Football League (GDFL), 2010–
  Rivals Professional Football League (RPFL), 2014–
  Liga de Fútbol Americano Profesional (LFA), 2016–

Planned leagues

High-level
  Spring League of American Football (SLAF), postponed
  Freedom Football League (FFL), postponed

Mid-level
  American Patriot League (APL), proposed to begin in 2020, but pushed back to 2023 because of the COVID-19 pandemic.
  American Spring Football League (ASFL), propose to begin in 2023.

Low-level
  Major League Football (MLF), propose to begin in 2022, but pushed back to 2023.

Developmental
  Young Superstars League, TBA (APL D-League).

Defunct Minor leagues

High-level
<ref name=YouSure>R.D. Griffith. ''To the NFL: You Sure Started Somethin, Dorrance Publishing, 2012. </ref>
  Anthracite League, 1924
  Ohio Valley League, 1925–1929
  American Football League, 1934
  American Association* 1936–1941/American Football League* 1946–1950
  Dixie League*, 1936–1942; 1946–1947
Originally South Atlantic Football Association  Midwest Football League, 1935–1939
Became American Professional Football Association in 1938, American Football League in 1939
  Pacific Coast Professional Football League*, 1940–1948
  American Football League, 1944
  United Football League, 1961–1964
  Atlantic Coast Football League‡, 1962–1971, 1973
  Continental Football League, 1965–1969
Supplemented the Professional Football League of America in 1968 and the Texas Football League in 1969.
  International Football League, 1983
  World League of American Football* 1991–1992/NFL Europe* 1995–2007
  Professional Spring Football League, 1992
  Fan Ownership League, 1996
  All-American Football League, 1997
  International Football Federation, 1999
  XFL, 2001
  All American Football League, 2007
  United Football League, 2009–2012
  New United States Football League, 2010, 2014
  A-11 Football League, 2014
  North American Football League, 2014
  Alliance of American Football, 2019

Mid-level
  Regional Football League, 1999
  Spring Football League, 2000
  Fall Experimental Football League, 2014–2015
  Major League Football, 2016; 2022

Low-level

  Pacific Coast League, 1926
  Eastern League of Professional Football, 1926–1927
  Anthracite League, 1928–1929
  Eastern Football League, 1932–1933
Renamed Interstate Football League in 1933
  Greater New York League, 1934–1935
Originally the New Jersey Football Circuit (1934)
  American Legion League, 1934–1935
  Northwest Football League, 1935–1938
Outgrowth of the Tri-States Football League (1934)
  New England Football League, 1936
  Virginia-Carolina Football League, 1937
  California Football League, 1938
  Eastern Pennsylvania Football League‡, 1938
  Northeast Football League, 1940–1942
  Ohio Professional Football League, 1941
  Northwest War Industries Football League, 1942
  Eastern Football League, 1944
  Virginia Negro League,  1946
  Central States Football League, 1948–1953
  Pacific Football Conference, 1957–1958
  American Football Conference, 1959–1961
  Central States Football League, 1962–1975
Outgrowth of the Bi-States Football League (1949–1959) and Tri-States Football League (1960–1961)
  Midwest Football League‡, 1962–1978
  Southern Football League, 1963–1965
Merger between the Dixie Football League (1961–1962) and Florida Football League (1962–1963)
  North Pacific Football League‡, 1963–1966
  New England Football League, 1964–1967
Renamed North Atlantic Football League in 1967
  North American Football League, 1965–1966
Supplemented the Southern Football League in 1966
  Professional Football League of America‡, 1965–1967
  Texas Football League 1966–1968
  United American Football League, 1967
  Trans-American Football League, 1970–1971
  Midwest Professional Football League‡, 1970–1972
  Seaboard Football League, 1971–1974
  Southwestern Football League, 1972–1973
  California Football League, 1974–1982
Renamed Western Football League for the 1976 season
  American Football Association, 1977–1983
  Northern States Football League, 1977–1985
  United Football Teams of America, 1982
  United National Gridiron League, 2007
  World Football League, 2008–2010
  Hawaii Professional Football League, 2011
  Stars Football League, 2011–2013
  Trinity Professional Spring Football League, 2018
  Fútbol Americano de México, 2019–2022

Developmental
  Pacific Pro Football, 2017
  The Spring League, 2017–2021
  Your Call Football, 2018–2019

 Official NFL / AFL minor league.
 Unofficial NFL minor league, that featured NFL farm team(s).
 Folded without playing.Notes'''

See also
 United Football Players Association

References

External links
 Can spring football ever work?
 NFL owners, coaches say a developmental league is needed
 NFL Minor Leagues: What Needs to Be Done to Help Develop Talent in the NFL
 Football needs another successful league to survive, for the good of the game
 Alliance of American Football is just the latest in a long line of failed start-up leagues
 Minor league markets rank: Methodology
 NFL to present formal proposals for a developmental league in 2017

American football competitions
Minor league American football
Defunct American football leagues in the United States
Semi-professional American football
Gridiron football
Sport in North America